Spider Lake is a  “all-sports” lake located about twenty minutes southeast of Downtown Traverse City in Grand Traverse County, Michigan. It is part of the Boardman River watershed.

Spider Lake teems with bass, bluegill, perch, pike, and crappie contained within  of shoreline. 
There are several vacation rentals and small resorts all around the lake as well as jet-ski rentals and many other water sports.

See also
List of lakes in Michigan

References

Lakes of Grand Traverse County, Michigan
Lakes of Michigan